Andreas Landmark (14 April 1769 – 2 December 1839) was a Norwegian politician.

Personal life
He was born in Christiania to Nils Svensson and Karen Andersdatter Killerud. His brother was Nils Landmark. Contrary to some sources, he was not born with the name Landmark, but some of the children took the name as adults.

He married Jacobine Caroline Wind (1733–1833). They had nine children, although at least one died young. One of their sons were Jens Landmark, known as a military officer and politician.

His wife, born in Borgund near Aalesund, was a distant relative of the brothers Peter Daniel Baade Wind Kildal and Peter Wessel Wind Kildal.

Career
Andreas Landmark worked as a bailiff in Søndmør.

In 1821 he was elected to the Norwegian Parliament, representing the constituency of Romsdals Amt. His brother Nils Landmark served during the same period.

Andreas Landmark died in 1839 in Ørsta.

References

1769 births
1839 deaths
Members of the Storting
Møre og Romsdal politicians
Norwegian people of Swedish descent